William Henry Traber, Jr. (born September 18, 1979) is an American former professional baseball pitcher. He played in Major League Baseball (MLB) for the Cleveland Indians, Washington Nationals, New York Yankees, and Boston Red Sox.

Playing career

College
Traber attended Loyola Marymount University, where he was First-Team All-American and West Coast Conference Player of the Year. He set a single-season school strikeout record with 156 strikeouts (in 123 innings pitched).

In , Traber entered the draft and was picked in the first round (16th overall) by the New York Mets.  The Mets were prepared to offer Traber a contract worth $1.3 million, but after an MRI showed some damage to his pitching elbow, he signed a contract worth only $400,000.

Professional career
In 2001, the Mets traded Traber to the Cleveland Indians along with Matt Lawton, Alex Escobar, Earl Snyder, and Jerrod Riggan for Roberto Alomar, Mike Bacsik, and Danny Peoples.

In , Traber was runner-up minor league pitcher of the year, going 17-5 for the Akron Aeros (Double-A) and Buffalo Bisons (Triple-A), and was voted by Baseball America as having the best control and curveball in the league.  His numbers were also good enough to give him top-honors for Cleveland pitching prospects.

On April 4, Traber made his Major League debut. Although he started out well (1.59 ERA, 1-0 record in seven games that spring)—even pitching a one-hit shutout of the New York Yankees on July 8—Traber's season fell apart when elbow problems that haunted him in college and the minors came back to end his '03 campaign and ultimately the entire  season when he needed Tommy John surgery.

During the 2004- offseason, the Boston Red Sox signed Traber. Before playing a single game, he was placed on waivers by the Red Sox. On November 10, 2004, he was claimed by the Indians off waivers and was signed to a minor league deal on December 22, 2004.

On December 5, he was released by the Washington Nationals after having pitched for them the previous two seasons.

On January 5, he signed a minor league deal with the New York Yankees and was invited to spring training. On March 15, he was added to the 40-man roster and he opened the season in the Yankee bullpen. He spent much of the season splitting time between the Yankees and their Triple-A affiliate. He was designated for assignment on September 1. In December , he signed a minor league contract with an invitation to spring training to return to the Red Sox.

On August 5, he was called up by the Red Sox to bolster their undermanned bullpen. In October 2009, Traber was granted free agency. He was designated for assignment on August 7, 2009. In June 2010, Traber was signed by the Seattle Mariners.

Teaching career
He is currently the Head Varsity baseball Coach and a physics teacher at his former high school, El Segundo High School.

References

External links

1979 births
Living people
Cleveland Indians players
Washington Nationals players
New York Yankees players
Boston Red Sox players
Baseball players from Torrance, California
Major League Baseball pitchers
Binghamton Mets players
St. Lucie Mets players
Norfolk Tides players
Akron Aeros players
Buffalo Bisons (minor league) players
Kinston Indians players
New Orleans Zephyrs players
Columbus Clippers players
Scranton/Wilkes-Barre Yankees players
Pawtucket Red Sox players
Tacoma Rainiers players
El Segundo High School alumni
Loyola Marymount Lions baseball players